The Kuriyama Dam is a rock-fill embankment dam on a tributary of the Togawa River located  northwest of Nikkō in Tochigi Prefecture, Japan. It was constructed between 1981 and 1985. Its reservoir serves as the upper reservoir for the 1,050 MW Imaichi Pumped Storage Power Station, while the Imaichi Dam forms the lower. Of that capacity,  is used to produce electricity at the power plant. It is owned and operated by TEPCO.

References

Rock-filled dams
Dams in Tochigi Prefecture
Dams completed in 1985